Pieri may refer to:

A member of the Pieres, an ancient Thracian tribe
Pieri (surname)

See also
Pieri's formula
Pieria (regional unit), a Greek administrative unit
Seleucia Pieria, an ancient Roman city in modern-day Turkey; and
 Pieria (Syria) its Roman prefecture